Aliciella micromeria (formerly Gilia micromeria) is a species of flowering plant in the phlox family known by the common name dainty gilia. It is native to the western United States, especially the Great Basin. It is a small herb producing a thin, branching stem up to about 14 centimeters tall. It is coated thinly in soft hairs. Several deeply lobed leaves 1 to 6 centimeters long are located in a basal rosette at ground level around the stem. There are smaller, unlobed leaves along the stem. The inflorescence produces white or lavender flowers each about 3 millimeters wide.

External links

Jepson Manual Treatment
Photo gallery

micromeria
Flora of the Western United States